Jordanoleiopus maynei is a species of beetle in the family Cerambycidae. It was described by Lepesme and Breuning in 1955.

References

Jordanoleiopus
Beetles described in 1955
Taxa named by Pierre Lepesme
Taxa named by Stephan von Breuning (entomologist)